Riff Raffy Daffy is a 1948 Warner Bros. Looney Tunes cartoon directed by Arthur Davis. The cartoon was released on November 27, 1948, and stars Daffy Duck and Porky Pig.

Plot
A homeless Daffy Duck is trying to find a place to sleep in a City Park. Porky Pig is a patrolling cop, who is telling Daffy that sleeping in the park (vagrancy) is against the law. Daffy tries to sleep on a park bench, in a trash can, up a tree, and even in a gopher's hole - evicting the gopher, furniture and all. After being kicked out of the park, Daffy complains that it is "the coldest night in 64 years" and wonders where he is going to sleep, after opening his big beak about the snow suddenly covering the scene.

Daffy spots a department store window with a comfortable living room-type display and goes inside. Porky sees him and the argument between the two begins, albeit their voices are silenced by the glass boundary in the display. Daffy uses a glass-cutter and a latch to create a makeshift door with the glass and the sounds of incoherent crosstalk goes on for a few seconds, only for Daffy to return inside the display, close the glass door, and then pull down the shade, saying to Porky, "Scram!"

Porky comes in the store using a skeleton key with an actual skull on the one end. Daffy jokes about the particular key and tricks the officer into a chair and have a cigar, along with a spritzer of soda water. Daffy then finds a bed to resume sleeping before Porky tries to hit the vagrant with a club, only to have Daffy warn the officer about violating the "sanctity of the American Home" and intimidates him towards the empty elevator shaft, causing him to fall. And as Daffy brags to himself, Porky comes back upstairs and clubs the vagrant on the head. 
Before Daffy falls unconsciously, he asks Porky for an aspirin for a splitting headache. The officer feels ashamed for hitting Daffy too hard and when he tries to wake him up, Daffy yells, "I love you, Hortense!" and gives Porky a smooch on the forehead and manages to escape for a moment. 
Daffy is unfortunately cornered by Porky, armed with the bow and arrow. The vagrant begs the officer not to do anything rash while distracting him with hidden brush from a nearby glue bottle onto Porky's grip, causing him to be sent flying instead of the arrow and crash into a grandfather clock, with its resident cuckoo shoving the inept officer out before making its call.

Daffy then tries to sleep in the hammock where Porky grabs both ends and drags the vagrant out. Little does the officer know, Daffy grabbed a bottle rocket from a nearby shelf and lights its fuse and gets away. Then Daffy, disguised as the elevator man, orders the customer to face the front into entering an empty shaft again with the rocket exploding him upwards before falling down again in a fiery fashion.

Then Daffy sleeps in a recliner chair when Porky comes back with an axe in hand, but then the vagrant later sleeps in a sleeping bag as Porky tries again, only to get bonked with a mallet by a snoozing Daffy.

The officer then tries to lure Daffy by borrowing a duck call, only to have the vagrant surprising him from behind. The chase resumes, but is cut short when Porky crashes into a glass booth. Daffy then gives the officer a "sporting chance" with a shotgun. At first, the officer refuses, but takes the offer and fires the gun as the pellets pursue their target. Thankfully, Daffy manages to avoid them, only to get cornered by Porky's cannon, ready to shoot down the duck, but good.
Daffy begs for sympathy from Porky for the sake of his two kids (Alfonse and Rodrigo, which are actually wind-up toy ducks that look like Daffy). Porky takes pity, telling Daffy that he can stay at the store, and justifying it by saying to himself that he understands Daffy's situation because he has three kids of his own (which are actually wind-up toy pigs).

See also
 Looney Tunes and Merrie Melodies filmography (1940–49)
 List of Daffy Duck cartoons

References

External links
 

1948 animated films
1948 short films
1948 films
Looney Tunes shorts
Films directed by Arthur Davis
Films set in department stores
1940s Warner Bros. animated short films
1948 comedy films
Daffy Duck films
Porky Pig films
Cinecolor films
Films about homelessness
1940s police comedy films
Films scored by Carl Stalling
American comedy short films
1940s English-language films